The 2018–19 Copa del Rey was the 117th staging of the Copa del Rey (including two seasons where two rival editions were played). The winners were assured a place in the 2019–20 UEFA Europa League group stage, and both they and the runners-up automatically qualified for the four-team 2019–20 Supercopa de España.

Barcelona entered the competition as four-time defending champions in an attempt to conquer an unprecedented fifth consecutive title. The Catalans reached the final for the sixth time in a row, but were beaten by Valencia 2–1 who achieved their eighth title overall and the first since 2008.

Schedule and format

Notes
Double-match rounds enforced the away goals rule, single-match rounds did not.
Single-match rounds ending in a tie were decided in extra time, and if still level, by a penalty shoot-out.

Qualified teams
The following teams are qualified for the competition. Reserve teams are excluded.

First round
41 teams entered the competition at this round. Five Segunda B or Tercera División teams that in the previous season did not play in Tercera División received a bye. The rest were paired according to proximity criteria.

Due to the breach of the competition rules, giving byes to unauthorised teams, the draw of the first and second round had to be partially repeated.

During the draw, Villanovense, Murcia, Badalona, Tudelano and Lorca FC received a bye to the second round.

Second round
The 22 Segunda División teams entered the competition in this round and were joined by the winners of the previous stage, except for Mutilvera, who received a bye to the third round. Segunda División teams were drawn against each other.

Third round
The Segunda División teams faced each other, except for Mallorca, who received a bye to the round of 32.

Final phase
The draw for the Round of 32 was held on 19 October 2018 at La Ciudad del Fútbol, Las Rozas de Madrid. In this round, all La Liga teams entered the competition.

Round of 32 pairings were as follows: the six remaining teams participating in the 2018–19 Segunda División B and Tercera División faced the four 2018–19 La Liga teams which qualified for the UEFA Champions League and two of the three teams which qualified for the Europa League. The six remaining teams participating in Segunda División faced the last Europa League team not drawn previously and other La Liga teams. The remaining teams faced each other. In matches involving teams from different league tiers, the team in the lower tier played the first leg at home. This rule was also be applied in the Round of 16, but not for the quarter-finals and semi-finals, in which the order of legs was based on the luck of the draw.

Bracket

Round of 32
The draw for the round of 32 took place on 19 October at La Ciudad del Fútbol, in Las Rozas de Madrid. On 23 October, the RFEF designated the referees for first leg matches. All first leg matches were scheduled to be played between 30 October and 1 November; however, the match between Athletic Bilbao and Huesca had to be postponed because of the preparations for an MTV concert in San Mamés. On 8 November, the RFEF made public the schedules for the second leg, scheduled to be played between 4 and 6 December.

Sant Andreu, from Tercera División (fourth tier), was the lowest-ranked team still in the competition.

|}

First leg

Second leg

Round of 16 
The Round of 16 draw took place on December 13, 2018 at Ciudad del Fútbol in Las Rozas, Madrid. The first leg took place in the second week of January and the return leg the following week.

Sporting Gijón, from Segunda División, was the only remaining team that did not play in the top tier.

In this round, the video assistant referee was applied for the first time ever in the Copa del Rey.

|}

First leg

Second leg

Quarter-finals
The draw for the quarter-finals took place on 18 January 2019 at Ciudad del Fútbol in Las Rozas, Madrid.

All remaining teams are from the top tier.

|}

First leg

Second leg

Semi-finals
The draw for the semi-finals took place on 1 February 2019 at the venue for the final of the competition, the Benito Villamarín Stadium.

All four teams remaining came from pot 2, which included teams involved in European competitions.

The winners of the semi-finals advance to the final and qualify for the 2019 Supercopa de España.

|}

First leg

Second leg

Final

The final took place on 25 May 2019 at the Benito Villamarín Stadium in Seville.

Top goalscorers

Notes

References

External links

Royal Spanish Football Federation official website
Copa del Rey at LFP website

2018-19
1